Bolesławiec  is a village in the administrative district of Gmina Mosina, within Poznań County, Greater Poland Voivodeship, in west-central Poland.

The village has an approximate population of 60.

References

Villages in Poznań County